West Winds, also known as the Burlingame-Quinn House, is a historic home in West Warwick, Rhode Island. The site was built c. 1740 and added to the National Register of Historic Places in 1993.

The house seems to have been built between 1736 and 1753, probably c.1740. At the time of purchase by George Burlingame (1777-1872) in 1819, the property encompassed  of farmland. In 1921 it was bought by Robert E. Quinn, a Rhode Island state senator, lieutenant governor, governor, and judge. It was Quinn who christened the property "West Winds". The building has been extensively renovated and expanded several times during its history. Much of the original farmland still surrounds the property as a golf course.

See also
National Register of Historic Places listings in Kent County, Rhode Island

References

Houses completed in 1740
Buildings and structures in West Warwick, Rhode Island
Houses on the National Register of Historic Places in Rhode Island
Houses in Kent County, Rhode Island
National Register of Historic Places in Kent County, Rhode Island